Japanese football in 1949.

Emperor's Cup

Births
March 5 - Shusaku Hirasawa
April 27 - Hiroji Imamura
August 17 - Mitsunori Fujiguchi
November 10 - Michio Yasuda

External links

 
Seasons in Japanese football